Pacificitalea manganoxidans is a Gram-negative, strictly aerobic, manganese-oxidizing and non-motile bacterium from the genus Pacificitalea which has been isolated from sediments of the Pacific Clarion-Clipperton Fracture Zone in China.

References

Rhodobacteraceae
Bacteria described in 2015